Han Kan is a crater on Mercury. It has a diameter of 50 kilometers. Its name was adopted by the International Astronomical Union (IAU) in 1985. Han Kan is named for the Chinese painter Han Gan, who lived from 720 to 780.

Han Kan has an extensive ray system extending for hundreds of kilometers.

References

Impact craters on Mercury